En Vivo en Buenos Aires (Spanish for Live in Buenos Aires) Released in 1994 is the ninth album and first live one from the Argentine ska reggae Latin rock band Los Fabulosos Cadillacs. It was well received and earned a gold disc.

Recorded in the Arena Obras Sanitarias following the huge success of Vasos Vacios. The album shows a young Cadillacs which put a lot of strength in the songs, mixing them with parts of other songs (like "Desapariciones" that is mixed with "Rio Manzanares" both of Ruben Blades) or with Vicentico putting strong vocal parts in a few songs like "Siguiendo la Luna".

Track listing 

 "Intro - No acabes" ("Intro - Don't cum") (Arnedo, Luca Prodan, Troglio)  – 1:47
 "Mi novia se cayó en un pozo ciego" ("My girlfriend fell in a blind hole") (Vicentico, Giugno, Rigozzi)  – 2:36
 "El aguijón" ("The Sting") (Vicentico) – 3:54
 "Vasos vacíos" ("Empty Glasses") (Vicentico) – 4:19
 "Desapariciones" ("Disappearances") (Ruben Blades) – 7:42
  "Manuel Santillán, el León" ("Manuel Santillan, The Lion") (Flavio Cianciarulo) – 5:03
 "Siguiendo la Luna" ("Following the Moon") (Sergio Rotman) – 8:57
 "Guns of Brixton" (Paul Simonon) – 4:17
 "You're Wondering Now" (Seymour) – 2:51
 "Gallo rojo" ("Red Rooster") (Vicentico) – 4:30

Personnel 

 Vicentico – vocals
 Flavio Cianciarulo – bass
 Anibal Rigozzi – guitar
 Mario Siperman – keyboards
 Fernando Ricciardi – drums
 Sergio Rotman – alto saxophone
 Daniel Lozano – trumpet & flugelhorn
 Fernando Albareda – trombone
 Gerardo Rotblat – percussion

External links 
Los Fabulosos Cadillacs Official Web Site
En Vivo en Buenos Aires at MusicBrainz
[ En Vivo en Buenos Aires] at Allmusic

References 

Los Fabulosos Cadillacs albums
1994 live albums
Sony Music Argentina live albums
Live albums recorded in Buenos Aires